Gigi Militaru (born 8 February 1986, in Lupeni, Transylvania) is a Romanian rugby union footballer. He plays the position of Prop and is currently playing for RC Timişoara in the Romanian Rugby Championship. He formed as a player at Ştiinţa Petroşani rugby club, Romania and also played for the team until he moved to RC Timişoara in 2012.

External links

 Gigi Militaru at Timișoara Saracens website

1986 births
Living people
People from Lupeni
Romanian rugby union players
București Wolves players
SCM Rugby Timișoara players
Rugby union props
Romania international rugby union players